Megachile mcnamarae is a species of bee in the family Megachilidae.

References

mcnamarae
Insects described in 1929